Chapleau 61 is a First Nations reserve close to Chapleau, Ontario. It is one of the reserves of the Michipicoten First Nation.

References

External links
 Canada Lands Survey System (note: listed under Chapleau Ojibway First Nation)

Ojibwe reserves in Ontario
Communities in Sudbury District